29th Street Yard (also known as Jackie Joyner-Kersee Yard) is a rail yard for the MetroLink light rail system in East St. Louis, Illinois. It is one of the Bi-State Development Agency's two operation and maintenance facilities for the SD-400 and SD-460 electric light rail vehicles, the other being Ewing Yard in St. Louis, Missouri. 

The yard opened in 2001 with the St. Clair County MetroLink extension. On October 27, 2009, Metro opened a new paint booth facility at the yard.

External links
MetroLink homepage
St. Clair County Transit District homepage

Metro Transit (St. Louis)
St. Clair County Transit District
MetroLink (St. Louis) infrastructure
MetroLink (St. Louis) yards and shops